The following is a list of Iowa Hawkeyes men's basketball head coaches at the University of Iowa in Iowa City, Iowa. The Iowa Hawkeyes men's basketball program has had had 22 head coaches (not including the 2nd time for Coach Rule, Coach O'Connor and Coach Williams) in their 118-season history. 18 of the 22 coaches have winning records at Iowa. The sortable list is by number of total Iowa program seasons. The list can be sorted by clicking on the column header.

Four Iowa Hawkeye men's basketball coaches have been inducted into the Naismith Basketball Hall of Fame: Sam Barry, Ralph Miller, Lute Olson and George Raveling.

References

Iowa

Iowa Hawkeyes basketball, men's, coaches